

The Loire 250 was a French single-seat fighter monoplane designed and built by Loire Aviation of St. Nazaire.

Design and development
The Loire 250 was built to meet a requirement for a single-seat fighter prototype to undergo a fly-off competition with the Dewoitine D.513 and Morane-Saulnier MS.405. The Loire 250 was an all-metal low-wing monoplane powered by a  Hispano-Suiza 14Ha-7a radial engine with a single enclosed cockpit and retractable conventional landing gear with a tailwheel. Only one prototype was produced; it first flew 27 September 1935. It was modified to improve performance before the fly-off but failed to gain a production order. The prototype was unarmed but it was intended to fit two 20 mm cannon and two 7.5 mm machine-guns if the type entered production.

Specifications

References

Notes

Bibliography

1930s French fighter aircraft
250